Five Ways railway station is a railway station serving the Five Ways and Lee Bank areas of Birmingham, England. It is situated on the Cross-City Line.

The original Five Ways station operated between 1885 and 1944. The station was reopened in 1978 when the Cross-City line services were created.

History

The original station was opened in 1885 by the Midland Railway, when the Birmingham West Suburban Railway (BWSR) was extended into Birmingham New Street. It fell prey to competition from local bus services, and services were suspended in 1944, as a wartime economy measure, under the auspices of the London, Midland and Scottish Railway. The closure was made permanent by British Railways in 1950.

Alongside the station was the spur line leading to  station. The junction to this line was just south of Five Ways. Following the closure of Granville Street in 1885, the spur line was extended to run to Central Goods station, which remained open until the late 1960s.

Reopening
The station was rebuilt and reopened in 1978 to the designs of the architect John Broome as part of the creation of the Cross-City Line services. Built with its main entrance on Islington Row Middleway. British Rail also carried out electrification of the lines through the station in 1993.

Ticket barriers were installed at the start of 2009 and became operational shortly before the end of April in the same year.

The station achieved a milestone in 2009–10 by having over 1 million "entries and exits", as denoted by ticket sales.

Local attractions

Five Ways is the nearest railway station to Birmingham Botanical Gardens, Edgbaston Cricket Ground and the Birmingham Oratory.

Services
Trains operate every 10 minutes during Monday-Saturday daytimes, every 10–20 minutes Monday-Saturday evenings, and every 30 minutes on Sundays.

Connections

References

External links

Rail Around Birmingham and the West Midlands: Five Ways railway station
Railways of Warwickshire entry

Railway stations in Birmingham, West Midlands
DfT Category D stations
Former Midland Railway stations
Railway stations in Great Britain opened in 1885
Railway stations in Great Britain closed in 1944
Railway stations in Great Britain opened in 1978
Railway stations served by West Midlands Trains
Reopened railway stations in Great Britain
1885 establishments in England
John Broome railway stations